GTD may refer to:
 Gender, Technology and Development, a scientific journal
 Geometric theory of diffraction
 Gestational trophoblastic disease
 Getting Things Done, a time management method and associated book by David Allen
 Global Terrorism Database, maintained at University of Maryland
 Volkswagen Golf Mk7#Golf GTD, Grand Tour Diesel car
 Gourinathdham railway station, in West Bengal, India
 Grapevine trunk disease
 Grand Tourer Daytona, a class in the WeatherTech SportsCar Championship.